Rafał Kwieciński (born June 18, 1975) is a Polish footballer.

Achievements
Faroese Cup: 1
 2007.

External links
 

1975 births
Living people
Polish footballers
Hutnik Nowa Huta players
Wawel Kraków players
Ruch Chorzów players
A.A.C. Eagles players
Górnik Wieliczka players
EB/Streymur players
Puszcza Niepołomice players
Footballers from Kraków
Association football midfielders
Polish expatriate footballers
Expatriate soccer players in the United States
Polish expatriate sportspeople in the United States
Expatriate footballers in the Faroe Islands
Polish expatriate sportspeople in the Faroe Islands